MCRT may refer to:

 Mass Central Rail Trail
 The fictional Major Case Response Team on NCIS (TV series)
 Monte Carlo ray tracing, a computer graphics rendering technique more commonly known as path tracing